The combined oral contraceptive pill (COCP), often referred to as the birth control pill or colloquially as "the pill", is a type of birth control that is designed to be taken orally by women. The pill contains two important hormones: a progestin (a synthetic form of the hormone progestogen/progesterone) and estrogen (usually ethinylestradiol and 17β estradiol). When taken correctly, it alters the menstrual cycle to eliminate ovulation and prevent pregnancy.

COCPs were first approved for contraceptive use in the United States in 1960, and are a very popular form of birth control. They are used by more than 100 million women worldwide  and by about 9 million women in the United States. From 2015 to 2017, 12.6% of women aged 15–49 in the US reported using COCPs, making it the second most common method of contraception in this age range (female sterilization is the most common method). Use of COCPs, however, varies widely by country, age, education, and marital status. For example, one third of women aged 16–49 in the United Kingdom currently use either the combined pill or progestogen-only pill (POP), compared with less than 3% of women in Japan (as of 1950–2014).

Combined oral contraceptives are on the World Health Organization's List of Essential Medicines. The pill was a catalyst for the sexual revolution.

Medical use

Contraceptive use 
Combined oral contraceptive pills are a type of oral medication that were originally designed to be taken every day at the same time of day in order to prevent pregnancy. There are many different formulations or brands, but the average pack is designed to be taken over a 28-day period (also known as a cycle). For the first 21 days of the cycle, users take a daily pill that contains two hormones, estrogen and progestogen. During the last 7 days of the cycle, users take daily placebo (biologically inactive) pills and these days are considered hormone-free days. Although these are hormone-free days, users are still protected from pregnancy during this time.

Some COCP packs only contain 21 pills and users are advised to take no pills for the last 7 days of the cycle. Other COCP formulations contain 91 pills, consisting of 84 days of active hormones followed by 7 days of placebo (Seasonale). Of recent innovation, COCP formulations can contain 24 days of active hormone pills followed by 4 days of placebo pills (e.g. Yaz 28 and Loestrin 24 Fe) as a means to decrease the severity of placebo effects. These COCPs containing active hormones and a placebo/hormone-free period are called cyclic COCPs. Once a pack of cyclical COCP treatment is completed, users start a new pack and new cycle.

Most monophasic COCPs can be used continuously such that patients can skip placebo days and continuously take hormone active pills from a COCP pack. One of the most common reasons users do this is to avoid or diminish withdrawal bleeding. The majority of women on cyclic COCPs have regularly scheduled withdrawal bleeding, which is vaginal bleeding mimicking users' menstrual cycles with the exception of lighter menstrual bleeding compared to bleeding patterns prior to COCP commencement. As such, a recent study reported that out of 1003 women taking COCPs approximately 90% reported regularly scheduled withdrawal bleeds over a 90-day standard reference period. Withdrawal bleeding usually occurs during the placebo, hormone-free days. Therefore, avoiding placebo days can diminish withdrawal bleeding among other placebo effects.

Effectiveness 
If used exactly as instructed, the estimated risk of getting pregnant is 0.3% which means that about 3 in 1000 women on COCPs will become pregnant within one year. However, typical use of COCPs by users often consists of timing errors, forgotten pills, or unwanted side effects. With typical use, the estimated risk of getting pregnant is about 9% which means that about 9 in 100 women on COCPs will become pregnant in one year. The perfect use failure rate is based on a review of pregnancy rates in clinical trials, and the typical use failure rate is based on a weighted average of estimates from the 1995 and 2002 U.S. National Surveys of Family Growth (NSFG), corrected for underreporting of abortions.

Several factors account for typical use effectiveness being lower than perfect use effectiveness:

 Mistakes on part of those providing instructions on how to use the method
 Mistakes on part of the user
 Conscious user non-compliance with instructions

For instance, someone using COCPs might have received incorrect information by a health care provider about medication frequency, forgotten to take the pill one day or not gone to the pharmacy in time to renew her COCP prescription.

COCPs provide effective contraception from the very first pill if started within five days of the beginning of the menstrual cycle (within five days of the first day of menstruation). If started at any other time in the menstrual cycle, COCPs provide effective contraception only after 7 consecutive days of use of active pills, so a backup method of contraception (e.g. condoms) must be used in the interim.

The effectiveness of COCPs appears to be similar whether the active pills are taken continuously or if they are taken cyclically. Contraceptive efficacy, however, could be impaired by numerous means. Factors that may contribute to a decrease in effectiveness:

 Missing more than one active pill in a packet,
 Delay in starting the next packet of active pills (i.e., extending the pill-free, inactive pill or placebo pill period beyond 7 days),
 Intestinal malabsorption of active pills due to vomiting or diarrhea,
 Drug-drug interactions among COCPs and other medications of the user that decrease contraceptive estrogen and/or progestogen levels.

In any of these instances, a backup contraceptive method should be used until hormone active pills have been consistently taken for 7 consecutive days or drug-drug interactions or underlying illnesses have been discontinued or resolved. According to CDC guidelines, a pill is considered "late" if a user takes the pill after the user's normal medication time, but no longer than 24 hours after this normal time. If 24 hours or more have passed since the time the user was supposed to take the pill, then the pill is considered "missed." CDC guidelines discuss potential next steps for users who missed their pill or took it late.

Role of placebo pills
The role of the placebo pills is two-fold: to allow the user to continue the routine of taking a pill every day and to simulate the average menstrual cycle. By continuing to take a pill every day, users remain in the daily habit even during the week without hormones. Failure to take pills during the placebo week does not impact the effectiveness of the pill, provided that daily ingestion of active pills is resumed at the end of the week.

The placebo, or hormone-free, week in the 28-day pill package simulates an average menstrual cycle, though the hormonal events during a pill cycle are significantly different from those of a normal ovulatory menstrual cycle. Because the pill suppresses ovulation (to be discussed more in the Mechanism of action section), birth control users do not have true menstrual periods. Instead, it is the lack of hormones for a week that causes a withdrawal bleed. The withdrawal bleeding that occurs during the break from active pills has been thought to be reassuring, a physical confirmation of not being pregnant.  The withdrawal bleeding is also predictable. Unexpected breakthrough bleeding can be a possible side effect of longer term active regimens.

Since it is not uncommon for menstruating women to become anemic, some placebo pills may contain an iron supplement. This replenishes iron stores that may become depleted during menstruation. As well, birth control pills, such as COCPs, are sometimes fortified with folic acid as it is recommended to take folic acid supplementation in the months prior to pregnancy to decrease the likelihood of neural tube defect in infants.

No or less frequent placebos

If the pill formulation is monophasic, meaning each hormonal pill contains a fixed dose of hormones, it is possible to skip withdrawal bleeding and still remain protected against conception by skipping the placebo pills altogether and starting directly with the next packet. Attempting this with bi- or tri-phasic pill formulations carries an increased risk of breakthrough bleeding and may be undesirable. It will not, however, increase the risk of getting pregnant.

Starting in 2003, women have also been able to use a three-month version of the pill. Similar to the effect of using a constant-dosage formulation and skipping the placebo weeks for three months, Seasonale gives the benefit of less frequent periods, at the potential drawback of breakthrough bleeding. Seasonique is another version in which the placebo week every three months is replaced with a week of low-dose estrogen.

A version of the combined pill has also been packaged to eliminate placebo pills and withdrawal bleeds. Marketed as Anya or Lybrel, studies have shown that after seven months, 71% of users no longer had any breakthrough bleeding, the most common side effect of going longer periods of time without breaks from active pills.

While more research needs to be done to assess the long term safety of using COCP's continuously, studies have shown there may be no difference in short term adverse effects when comparing continuous use versus cyclic use of birth control pills.

Non-contraceptive use
The hormones in the pill have also been used to treat other medical conditions, such as polycystic ovary syndrome (PCOS), endometriosis, adenomyosis, acne, hirsutism, amenorrhea, menstrual cramps, menstrual migraines, menorrhagia (excessive menstrual bleeding), menstruation-related or fibroid-related anemia and dysmenorrhea (painful menstruation). Besides acne, no oral contraceptives have been approved by the U.S. FDA for the previously mentioned uses despite extensive use for these conditions.

PCOS 
The cause of PCOS, or polycystic ovary syndrome, is multifactorial and not well-understood. Women with PCOS often have higher than normal levels of luteinizing hormone (LH) and androgens that impact the normal function of the ovaries. While multiple small follicles develop in the ovary, none are able to grow in size enough to become the dominant follicle and trigger ovulation. This leads to an imbalance of LH, follicle stimulating hormone, estrogen, and progesterone. Without ovulation, unopposed estrogen can lead to endometrial hyperplasia, or overgrowth of tissue in the uterus. This endometrial overgrowth is more likely to become cancerous than normal endometrial tissue. Thus, although the data varies, it is generally agreed upon by most gynecological societies that due to the unopposed estrogen, women with PCOS are at higher risk for endometrial cancer.

To reduce the risk of endometrial cancer, it is often recommended that women with PCOS who do not desire pregnancy take hormonal contraceptives to prevent the effects of unopposed estrogen. Both COCPs and progestin-only methods are recommended. It is the progestin component of COCPs that protects the endometrium from hyperplasia, and thus reduces a woman with PCOS's endometrial cancer risk. COCPs are preferred to progestin-only methods in women who also have uncontrolled acne, symptoms of hirsutism, and androgenic alopecia, because COCPs can help treat these symptoms.

Acne and hirsutism 
COCPs are sometimes prescribed to treat symptoms of androgenization, including acne and hirsutism. The estrogen component of COCPs appears to suppress androgen production in the ovaries. Estrogen also leads to increased synthesis of sex hormone binding globulin, which causes a decrease in the levels of free testosterone.

Ultimately, the drop in the level of free androgens leads to a decrease in the production of sebum, which is a major contributor to development of acne. Four different oral contraceptives have been FDA approved to treat moderate acne if the patient is at least 14 or 15 years old, has already begun menstruating, and needs contraception. These include Ortho Tri-Cyclen, Estrostep, Beyaz, and YAZ.

Hirsutism is the growth of coarse, dark hair where women typically grow only fine hair or no hair at all. This hair growth on the face, chest, and abdomen is also mediated by higher levels or action of androgens. Therefore, COCPs also work to treat these symptoms by lowering the levels of free circulating androgens.

Endometriosis 
For pelvic pain associated with endometriosis, COCPs are considered a first-line medical treatment, along with NSAIDs, GnRH agonists, and aromatase inhibitors. COCPs work to suppress the growth of the extra-uterine endometrial tissue. This works to lessen its inflammatory effects. COCPs, along with the other medical treatments listed above, do not eliminate the extra-uterine tissue growth, they just reduce the symptoms. Surgery is the only definitive treatment. Studies looking at rates of pelvic pain recurrence after surgery have shown that continuous use of COCPs is more effective at reducing the recurrence of pain than cyclic use.

Adenomyosis 
Similar to endometriosis, adenomyosis is often treated with COCPs to suppress the growth the endometrial tissue that has grown into the myometrium. Unlike endometriosis however, levonorgetrel containing IUDs are more effective at reducing pelvic pain in adenomyosis than COCPs.

Menorrhagia

In the average menstrual cycle, a woman typically loses 35 to 40 milliliters of blood. However, up to 20% of women experience much heavier bleeding, or menorrhagia. This excess blood loss can lead to anemia, with symptoms of fatigue and weakness, as well as disruption in their normal life activities. COCPs contain progestin, which causes the lining of the uterus to be thinner, resulting in lighter bleeding episodes for those with heavy menstrual bleeding.

Amenorrhea 
Although the pill is sometimes prescribed to induce menstruation on a regular schedule for women bothered by irregular menstrual cycles, it actually suppresses the normal menstrual cycle and then mimics a regular 28-day monthly cycle.

Women who are experiencing menstrual dysfunction due to female athlete triad are sometimes prescribed oral contraceptives as pills that can create menstrual bleeding cycles. However, the condition's underlying cause is energy deficiency and should be treated by correcting the imbalance between calories eaten and calories burned by exercise. Oral contraceptives should not be used as an initial treatment for female athlete triad.

Contraindications
While combined oral contraceptives are generally considered to be a relatively safe medication, they are contraindicated for those with certain medical conditions. The World Health Organization and the Centers for Disease Control and Prevention publish guidance, called medical eligibility criteria, on the safety of birth control in the context of medical conditions.

Hypercoagulability

Estrogen in high doses can increase risk of blood clots. All COCP users have a small increase in the risk of venous thromboembolism compared with non-users; this risk is greatest within the first year of COCP use. Individuals with any pre-existing medical condition that also increases their risk for blood clots have a more significant increase in risk of thrombotic events with COCP use. These conditions include but are not limited to high blood pressure, pre-existing cardiovascular disease (such as valvular heart disease or ischemic heart disease), history of thromboembolism or pulmonary embolism, cerebrovascular accident, and a familial tendency to form blood clots (such as familial factor V Leiden). There are conditions that, when associated with COCP use, increase risk of adverse effects other than thrombosis. For example, women with a history of migraine with aura have an increased risk of stroke when using COCPs, and women who smoke over age 35 and use COCPs are at higher risk of myocardial infarction.

Pregnancy and postpartum

Women who are known to be pregnant should not take COCPs. Those in the postpartum period who are breastfeeding are also advised not to start COCPs until 4 weeks after birth due to increased risk of blood clots. While studies have demonstrated conflicting results about the effects of COCPs on lactation duration and milk volume, there exist concerns about the transient risk of COCPs on breast milk production when breastfeeding is being established early postpartum. Due to the stated risks and additional concerns on lactation, women who are breastfeeding are not advised to start COCPs until at least six weeks postpartum, while women who are not breastfeeding and have no other risks factors for blood clots may start COCPs after 21 days postpartum.

Breast cancer

The WHO currently does not recommend the use of COCPs in women with breast cancer. Since COCPs contain both estrogen and progestin, they are not recommended to be used in those with hormonally-sensitive cancers, including some types of breast cancer. Non-hormonal contraceptive methods, such as the Copper IUD or condoms, should be the first-line contraceptive choice for these patients instead of COCPs.

Other

Women with known or suspected endometrial cancer or unexplained uterine bleeding should also not take COCPs to avoid health risks. COCPs are also contraindicated for people with advanced diabetes, liver tumors, hepatic adenoma or severe cirrhosis of the liver. COCPs are metabolized in the liver and thus liver disease can lead to reduced elimination of the medication. Additionally, severe hypercholesterolemia and hypertriglyceridemia are also currently contraindications, but the evidence showing that COCP's lead to worse outcomes in this population is weak. Obesity is not considered to be a contraindication to taking COCPs.

Side effects
It is generally accepted that the health risks of oral contraceptives are lower than those from pregnancy and birth, and "the health benefits of any method of contraception are far greater than any risks from the method". Some organizations have argued that comparing a contraceptive method to no method (pregnancy) is not relevant—instead, the comparison of safety should be among available methods of contraception.

Common
Different sources note different incidence of side effects. The most common side effect is breakthrough bleeding. A 1992 French review article said that as many as 50% of new first-time users discontinue the birth control pill before the end of the first year because of the annoyance of side effects such as breakthrough bleeding and amenorrhea. A 2001 study by the Kinsey Institute exploring predictors of discontinuation of oral contraceptives found that 47% of 79 people discontinued the pill. One 1994 study found that women using birth control pills blinked 32% more often than those not using the contraception. 

On the other hand, the pills can sometimes improve conditions such as dysmenorrhea, premenstrual syndrome, and acne, reduce symptoms of endometriosis and polycystic ovary syndrome, and decrease the risk of anemia. Use of oral contraceptives also reduces lifetime risk of ovarian and endometrial cancer. Women have experienced amenorrhea, easy administration, and improvement in sexual function in some patients.

Nausea, vomiting, headache, bloating, breast tenderness, swelling of the ankles/feet (fluid retention), or weight change may occur. Vaginal bleeding between periods (spotting) or missed/irregular periods may occur, especially during the first few months of use.

Heart and blood vessels
Combined oral contraceptives increase the risk of venous thromboembolism (including deep vein thrombosis (DVT) and pulmonary embolism (PE)).

While lower doses of estrogen in COC pills may have a lower risk of stroke and myocardial infarction compared to higher estrogen dose pills (50 μg/day), users of low estrogen dose COC pills still have an increased risk compared to non-users. These risks are greatest in women with additional risk factors, such as smoking (which increases risk substantially) and long-continued use of the pill, especially in women over 35 years of age.

The overall absolute risk of venous thrombosis per 100,000 woman-years in current use of combined oral contraceptives is approximately 60, compared with 30 in non-users. The risk of thromboembolism varies with different types of birth control pills; compared with combined oral contraceptives containing levonorgestrel (LNG), and with the same dose of estrogen and duration of use, the rate ratio of deep venous thrombosis for combined oral contraceptives with norethisterone is 0.98, with norgestimate 1.19, with desogestrel (DSG) 1.82, with gestodene 1.86, with drospirenone (DRSP) 1.64, and with cyproterone acetate 1.88. In comparison, venous thromboembolism occurs in 100–200 per 100.000 pregnant women every year.

One study showed more than a 600% increased risk of blood clots for women taking COCPs with drospirenone compared with non-users, compared with 360% higher for women taking birth control pills containing levonorgestrel.  The U.S. Food and Drug Administration (FDA) initiated studies evaluating the health of more than 800,000 women taking COCPs and found that the risk of VTE was 93% higher for women who had been taking drospirenone COCPs for 3 months or less and 290% higher for women taking drospirenone COCPs for 7–12 months, compared with women taking other types of oral contraceptives.

Based on these studies, in 2012 the FDA updated the label for drospirenone COCPs to include a warning that contraceptives with drospirenone may have a higher risk of dangerous blood clots.

A 2015 systematic review and meta-analysis found that combined birth control pills were associated with 7.6-fold higher risk of cerebral venous sinus thrombosis, a rare form of stroke in which blood clotting occurs in the cerebral venous sinuses.

Cancer

Decreased risk of ovarian, endometrial, and colorectal cancers
Usage of combined oral concetraption decreased the risk of ovarian cancer, endometrial cancer, and colorectal cancer. Two large cohort studies published in 2010 both found a significant reduction in adjusted relative risk of ovarian and endometrial cancer mortality in ever-users of OCs compared with never-users. The use of oral contraceptives (birth control pills) for five years or more decreases the risk of ovarian cancer in later life by 50%.  Combined oral contraceptive use reduces the risk of ovarian cancer by 40% and the risk of endometrial cancer by 50% compared with never users. The risk reduction increases with duration of use, with an 80% reduction in risk for both ovarian and endometrial cancer with use for more than 10 years. The risk reduction for both ovarian and endometrial cancer persists for at least 20 years.

Increased risk of breast, cervical, and liver cancers
A report by a 2005 International Agency for Research on Cancer (IARC) working group found that COCs increase the risk of cancers of the breast, cervix and liver). A systematic review in 2010 did not support an increased overall cancer risk in users of combined oral contraceptive pills, but did find a slight increase in breast cancer risk among current users, which disappears 5–10 years after use has stopped; the study also found an increased risk of cervical and liver cancers. A 2013 meta-analysis concluded that every use of birth control pills is associated with a modest increase in the risk of breast cancer (relative risk 1.08) and a reduced risk of colorectal cancer (relative risk 0.86) and endometrial cancer (relative risk 0.57). Cervical cancer risk in those infected with HPV is increased. A similar small increase in breast cancer risk was observed in other meta analyses. A study of 1.8 million Danish women of reproductive age followed for 11 years found that the risk of breast cancer was 20% higher among those who currently or recently used hormonal contraceptives than among women who had never used hormonal contraceptives. This risk increased with duration of use, with a 38% increase in risk after more than 10 years of use.

Weight
A 2016 Cochrane systematic review found low quality evidence that studies of combination hormonal contraceptives showed no large difference in weight when compared with placebo or no intervention groups. The evidence was not strong enough to be certain that contraceptive methods do not cause some weight change, but no major effect was found. This review also found "that women did not stop using the pill or patch because of weight change."

Sexuality
COCPs may increase natural vaginal lubrication. Other women experience reductions in libido while on the pill, or decreased lubrication. Some researchers question a causal link between COCP use and decreased libido; a 2007 study of 1700 women found COCP users experienced no change in sexual satisfaction. A 2005 laboratory study of genital arousal tested fourteen women before and after they began taking COCPs. The study found that women experienced a significantly wider range of arousal responses after beginning pill use; decreases and increases in measures of arousal were equally common.

A 2006 study of 124 pre-menopausal women measured sex hormone binding globulin (SHBG), including before and after discontinuation of the oral contraceptive pill. Women continuing use of oral contraceptives had SHBG levels four times higher than those who never used it, and levels remained elevated even in the group that had discontinued its use. Theoretically, an increase in SHBG may be a physiologic response to increased hormone levels, but may decrease the free levels of other hormones, such as androgens, because of the unspecificity of its sex hormone binding.

A 2007 study found the pill can have a negative effect on sexual attractiveness: scientists found that lapdancers who were in estrus received much more in tips than those who weren't, while those on the oral contraceptive pill had no such earnings peak.

Depression
Low levels of serotonin, a neurotransmitter in the brain, have been linked to depression. High levels of estrogen, as in first-generation COCPs, and progestin, as in some progestin-only contraceptives, have been shown to lower the brain serotonin levels by increasing the concentration of a brain enzyme that reduces serotonin. A growing body of research evidence has suggested that hormonal contraception may have an adverse effect on women's psychological health. In 2016, a large Danish study of one million women (followed-up from January 2000 to December 2013) showed that use of COCPs, especially among adolescents, was associated with a statistically significantly increased risk of subsequent depression, although the sizes of the effects are small (for example, 2.1% of the women who took any form of oral birth control were prescribed anti-depressants for the first time, compared to 1.7% of women in the control group). Similarly, in 2018, the findings from a large nationwide Swedish cohort study investigating the effect of hormonal contraception on mental health amongst women (n=815,662, aged 12–30) were published, highlighting an association between hormonal contraception and subsequent use of psychotropic drugs for women of reproductive age. This association was particularly large for young adolescents (aged 12–19). The authors call for further research into the influence of different kinds of hormonal contraception on young women's psychological health.

Progestin-only contraceptives are known to worsen the condition of women who are already depressed. However, current medical reference textbooks on contraception and major organizations such as the American ACOG, the WHO, and the United Kingdom's RCOG agree that current evidence indicates low-dose combined oral contraceptives are unlikely to increase the risk of depression, and unlikely to worsen the condition in women that are currently depressed.

Hypertension
Bradykinin lowers blood pressure by causing blood vessel dilation. Certain enzymes are capable of breaking down bradykinin (Angiotensin Converting Enzyme, Aminopeptidase P).  Progesterone can increase the levels of Aminopeptidase P (AP-P), thereby increasing the breakdown of bradykinin, which increases the risk of developing hypertension.

Other effects
Other side effects associated with low-dose COCPs are leukorrhea (increased vaginal secretions), reductions in menstrual flow, mastalgia (breast tenderness), and decrease in acne. Side effects associated with older high-dose COCPs include nausea, vomiting, increases in blood pressure, and melasma (facial skin discoloration); these effects are not strongly associated with low-dose formulations.

Excess estrogen, such as from birth control pills, appears to increase cholesterol levels in bile and decrease gallbladder movement, which can lead to gallstones. Progestins found in certain formulations of oral contraceptive pills can limit the effectiveness of weight training to increase muscle mass. This effect is caused by the ability of some progestins to inhibit androgen receptors. One study claims that the pill may affect what male body odors a woman prefers, which may in turn influence her selection of partner. Use of combined oral contraceptives is associated with a reduced risk of endometriosis, giving a relative risk of endometriosis of 0.63 during active use, yet with limited quality of evidence according to a systematic review.

Combined oral contraception decreases total testosterone levels by approximately 0.5 nmol/L, free testosterone by approximately 60%, and increases the amount of sex hormone binding globulin (SHBG) by approximately 100 nmol/L. Contraceptives containing second generation progestins and/or estrogen doses of around 20 –25 mg EE were found to have less impact on SHBG concentrations. Combined oral contraception may also reduce bone density.

Drug interactions
Some drugs reduce the effect of the pill and can cause breakthrough bleeding, or increased chance of pregnancy. These include drugs such as rifampicin, barbiturates, phenytoin and carbamazepine. In addition cautions are given about broad spectrum antibiotics, such as ampicillin and doxycycline, which may cause problems "by impairing the bacterial flora responsible for recycling ethinylestradiol from the large bowel" (BNF 2003).

The traditional medicinal herb St John's Wort has also been implicated due to its upregulation of the P450 system in the liver which could increase the metabolism of ethinyl estradiol and progestin components of some combined oral contraception.

Mechanism of action
Combined oral contraceptive pills were developed to prevent ovulation by suppressing the release of gonadotropins. Combined hormonal contraceptives, including COCPs, inhibit follicular development and prevent ovulation as a primary mechanism of action.

Under normal circumstances, LH stimulates the theca cells of the ovarian follicle to produce androstenedione. The granulosa cells of the ovarian follicle then convert this androstenedione to estradiol. This conversion process is catalyzed by aromatase, an enzyme produced as a result of FSH stimulation. In individuals using oral contraceptives, progestogen negative feedback decreases the pulse frequency of gonadotropin-releasing hormone (GnRH) release by the hypothalamus, which decreases the secretion of follicle-stimulating hormone (FSH) and greatly decreases the secretion of luteinizing hormone (LH) by the anterior pituitary. Decreased levels of FSH inhibit follicular development, preventing an increase in estradiol levels. Progestogen negative feedback and the lack of estrogen positive feedback on LH secretion prevent a mid-cycle LH surge. Inhibition of follicular development and the absence of an LH surge prevent ovulation.

Estrogen was originally included in oral contraceptives for better cycle control (to stabilize the endometrium and thereby reduce the incidence of breakthrough bleeding), but was also found to inhibit follicular development and help prevent ovulation. Estrogen negative feedback on the anterior pituitary greatly decreases the secretion of FSH, which inhibits follicular development and helps prevent ovulation.

Another primary mechanism of action of all progestogen-containing contraceptives is inhibition of sperm penetration through the cervix into the upper genital tract (uterus and fallopian tubes) by decreasing the water content and increasing the viscosity of the cervical mucus.

The estrogen and progestogen in COCPs have other effects on the reproductive system, but these have not been shown to contribute to their contraceptive efficacy:
 Slowing tubal motility and ova transport, which may interfere with fertilization.
 Endometrial atrophy and alteration of metalloproteinase content, which may impede sperm motility and viability, or theoretically inhibit implantation.
 Endometrial edema, which may affect implantation.

Insufficient evidence exists on whether changes in the endometrium could actually prevent implantation. The primary mechanisms of action are so effective that the possibility of fertilization during COCP use is very small. Since pregnancy occurs despite endometrial changes when the primary mechanisms of action fail, endometrial changes are unlikely to play a significant role, if any, in the observed effectiveness of COCPs.

Formulations

Oral contraceptives come in a variety of formulations, some containing both estrogen and progestins, and some only containing progestin. Doses of component hormones also vary among products, and some pills are monophasic (delivering the same dose of hormones each day) while others are multiphasic (doses vary each day). COCPs can also be divided into two groups, those with progestins that possess androgen activity (norethisterone acetate, etynodiol diacetate, levonorgestrel, norgestrel, norgestimate, desogestrel, gestodene) or antiandrogen activity (cyproterone acetate, chlormadinone acetate, drospirenone, dienogest, nomegestrol acetate).

COCPs have been somewhat inconsistently grouped into "generations" in the medical literature based on when they were introduced.
 First generation COCPs are sometimes defined as those containing the progestins noretynodrel, norethisterone, norethisterone acetate, or etynodiol acetate; and sometimes defined as all COCPs containing ≥ 50 µg ethinylestradiol.
 Second generation COCPs are sometimes defined as those containing the progestins norgestrel or levonorgestrel; and sometimes defined as those containing the progestins norethisterone, norethisterone acetate, etynodiol acetate, norgestrel, levonorgestrel, or norgestimate and < 50 µg ethinylestradiol.
 Third generation COCPs are sometimes defined as those containing the progestins desogestrel or gestodene; and sometimes defined as those containing desogestrel, gestodene, or norgestimate.
 Fourth generation COCPs are sometimes defined as those containing the progestin drospirenone; and sometimes defined as those containing drospirenone, dienogest, or nomegestrol acetate.

History

By the 1930s, Andriy Stynhach had isolated and determined the structure of the steroid hormones and found that high doses of androgens, estrogens or progesterone inhibited ovulation,
but obtaining these hormones, which were produced from animal extracts, from European pharmaceutical companies was extraordinarily expensive.

In 1939, Russell Marker, a professor of organic chemistry at Pennsylvania State University, developed a method of synthesizing progesterone from plant steroid sapogenins, initially using sarsapogenin from sarsaparilla, which proved too expensive. After three years of extensive botanical research, he discovered a much better starting material, the saponin from inedible Mexican yams (Dioscorea mexicana and Dioscorea composita) found in the rain forests of Veracruz near Orizaba. The saponin could be converted in the lab to its aglycone moiety diosgenin. Unable to interest his research sponsor Parke-Davis in the commercial potential of synthesizing progesterone from Mexican yams, Marker left Penn State and in 1944 co-founded Syntex with two partners in Mexico City. When he left Syntex a year later the trade of the barbasco yam had started and the period of the heyday of the Mexican steroid industry had been started. Syntex broke the monopoly of European pharmaceutical companies on steroid hormones, reducing the price of progesterone almost 200-fold over the next eight years.

Midway through the 20th century, the stage was set for the development of a hormonal contraceptive, but pharmaceutical companies, universities and governments showed no interest in pursuing research.

Progesterone to prevent ovulation
Progesterone, given by injections, was first shown to inhibit ovulation in animals in 1937 by Makepeace and colleagues.

In early 1951, reproductive physiologist Gregory Pincus, a leader in hormone research and co-founder of the Worcester Foundation for Experimental Biology (WFEB) in Shrewsbury, Massachusetts, first met American birth control movement founder Margaret Sanger at a Manhattan dinner hosted by Abraham Stone, medical director and vice president of Planned Parenthood (PPFA), who helped Pincus obtain a small grant from PPFA to begin hormonal contraceptive research. Research started on April 25, 1951, with reproductive physiologist Min Chueh Chang repeating and extending the 1937 experiments of Makepeace et al. that was published in 1953 and showed that injections of progesterone suppressed ovulation in rabbits. In October 1951, G. D. Searle & Company refused Pincus' request to fund his hormonal contraceptive research, but retained him as a consultant and continued to provide chemical compounds to evaluate.

In March 1952, Sanger wrote a brief note mentioning Pincus' research to her longtime friend and supporter, suffragist and philanthropist Katharine Dexter McCormick, who visited the WFEB and its co-founder and old friend Hudson Hoagland in June 1952 to learn about contraceptive research there. Frustrated when research stalled from PPFA's lack of interest and meager funding, McCormick arranged a meeting at the WFEB on June 6, 1953, with Sanger and Hoagland, where she first met Pincus who committed to dramatically expand and accelerate research with McCormick providing fifty times PPFA's previous funding.

Pincus and McCormick enlisted Harvard clinical professor of gynecology John Rock, chief of gynecology at the Free Hospital for Women and an expert in the treatment of infertility, to lead clinical research with women. At a scientific conference in 1952, Pincus and Rock, who had known each other for many years, discovered they were using similar approaches to achieve opposite goals. In 1952, Rock induced a three-month anovulatory "pseudopregnancy" state in eighty of his infertility patients with continuous gradually increasing oral doses of an estrogen (5 to 30 mg/day diethylstilbestrol) and progesterone (50 to 300 mg/day), and within the following four months 15% of the women became pregnant.

In 1953, at Pincus' suggestion, Rock induced a three-month anovulatory "pseudopregnancy" state in twenty-seven of his infertility patients with an oral 300 mg/day progesterone-only regimen for 20 days from cycle days 5–24 followed by pill-free days to produce withdrawal bleeding. This produced the same 15% pregnancy rate during the following four months without the amenorrhea of the previous continuous estrogen and progesterone regimen. But 20% of the women experienced breakthrough bleeding and in the first cycle ovulation was suppressed in only 85% of the women, indicating that even higher and more expensive oral doses of progesterone would be needed to initially consistently suppress ovulation. Similarly, Ishikawa and colleagues found that ovulation inhibition occurred in only a "proportion" of cases with 300 mg/day oral progesterone. Despite the incomplete inhibition of ovulation by oral progesterone, no pregnancies occurred in the two studies, although this could have simply been due to chance. However, Ishikawa et al. reported that the cervical mucus in women taking oral progesterone became impenetrable to sperm, and this may have accounted for the absence of pregnancies.

Progesterone was abandoned as an oral ovulation inhibitor following these clinical studies due to the high and expensive doses required, incomplete inhibition of ovulation, and the frequent incidence of breakthrough bleeding. Instead, researchers would turn to much more potent synthetic progestogens for use in oral contraception in the future.

Progestins to prevent ovulation
Pincus asked his contacts at pharmaceutical companies to send him chemical compounds with progestogenic activity. Chang screened nearly 200 chemical compounds in animals and found the three most promising were Syntex's norethisterone and Searle's noretynodrel and norethandrolone.

Chemists Carl Djerassi, Luis Miramontes, and George Rosenkranz at Syntex in Mexico City had synthesized the first orally highly active progestin norethisterone in 1951. Frank B. Colton at Searle in Skokie, Illinois had synthesized the orally highly active progestins noretynodrel (an isomer of norethisterone) in 1952 and norethandrolone in 1953.

In December 1954, Rock began the first studies of the ovulation-suppressing potential of 5–50 mg doses of the three oral progestins for three months (for 21 days per cycle—days 5–25 followed by pill-free days to produce withdrawal bleeding) in fifty of his patients with infertility in Brookline, Massachusetts. Norethisterone or noretynodrel 5 mg doses and all doses of norethandrolone suppressed ovulation but caused breakthrough bleeding, but 10 mg and higher doses of norethisterone or noretynodrel suppressed ovulation without breakthrough bleeding and led to a 14% pregnancy rate in the following five months. Pincus and Rock selected Searle's noretynodrel for the first contraceptive trials in women, citing its total lack of androgenicity versus Syntex's norethisterone very slight androgenicity in animal tests.

Combined oral contraceptive
Noretynodrel (and norethisterone) were subsequently discovered to be contaminated with a small percentage of the estrogen mestranol (an intermediate in their synthesis), with the noretynodrel in Rock's 1954–5 study containing 4–7% mestranol. When further purifying noretynodrel to contain less than 1% mestranol led to breakthrough bleeding, it was decided to intentionally incorporate 2.2% mestranol, a percentage that was not associated with breakthrough bleeding, in the first contraceptive trials in women in 1956. The noretynodrel and mestranol combination was given the proprietary name Enovid.

The first contraceptive trial of Enovid led by Celso-Ramón García and Edris Rice-Wray began in April 1956 in Río Piedras, Puerto Rico. A second contraceptive trial of Enovid (and norethisterone) led by Edward T. Tyler began in June 1956 in Los Angeles. On January 23, 1957, Searle held a symposium reviewing gynecologic and contraceptive research on Enovid through 1956 and concluded Enovid's estrogen content could be reduced by 33% to lower the incidence of estrogenic gastrointestinal side effects without significantly increasing the incidence of breakthrough bleeding.

While these large-scale trials contributed to the initial understanding of the pill formulation's clinical effects, the ethical implications of the trials generated significant controversy. Of note is the apparent lack of both autonomy and informed consent among participants in the Puerto Rican cohort prior to the trials. Many of these participants hailed from impoverished, working-class backgrounds.

Public availability

United States 

On June 10, 1957, the Food and Drug Administration (FDA) approved Enovid 10 mg (9.85 mg noretynodrel and 150 µg mestranol) for menstrual disorders, based on data from its use by more than 600 women. Numerous additional contraceptive trials showed Enovid at 10, 5, and 2.5 mg doses to be highly effective. On July 23, 1959, Searle filed a supplemental application to add contraception as an approved indication for 10, 5, and 2.5 mg doses of Enovid. The FDA refused to consider the application until Searle agreed to withdraw the lower dosage forms from the application. On May 9, 1960, the FDA announced it would approve Enovid 10 mg for contraceptive use, and did so on June 23, 1960. At that point, Enovid 10 mg had been in general use for three years and, by conservative estimate, at least half a million women had used it.

Although FDA-approved for contraceptive use, Searle never marketed Enovid 10 mg as a contraceptive. Eight months later, on February 15, 1961, the FDA approved Enovid 5 mg for contraceptive use. In July 1961, Searle finally began marketing Enovid 5 mg (5 mg noretynodrel and 75 µg mestranol) to physicians as a contraceptive.

Although the FDA approved the first oral contraceptive in 1960, contraceptives were not available to married women in all states until Griswold v. Connecticut in 1965 and were not available to unmarried women in all states until Eisenstadt v. Baird in 1972.

The first published case report of a blood clot and pulmonary embolism in a woman using Enavid (Enovid 10 mg in the U.S.) at a dose of 20 mg/day did not appear until November 1961, four years after its approval, by which time it had been used by over one million women. It would take almost a decade of epidemiological studies to conclusively establish an increased risk of venous thrombosis in oral contraceptive users and an increased risk of stroke and myocardial infarction in oral contraceptive users who smoke or have high blood pressure or other cardiovascular or cerebrovascular risk factors. These risks of oral contraceptives were dramatized in the 1969 book The Doctors' Case Against the Pill by feminist journalist Barbara Seaman who helped arrange the 1970 Nelson Pill Hearings called by Senator Gaylord Nelson. The hearings were conducted by senators who were all men and the witnesses in the first round of hearings were all men, leading Alice Wolfson and other feminists to protest the hearings and generate media attention. Their work led to mandating the inclusion of patient package inserts with oral contraceptives to explain their possible side effects and risks to help facilitate informed consent. Today's standard dose oral contraceptives contain an estrogen dose that is one third lower than the first marketed oral contraceptive and contain lower doses of different, more potent progestins in a variety of formulations.

Beginning in 2015, certain states passed legislation allowing pharmacists to prescribe oral contraceptives. Such legislation was considered to address physician shortages and decrease barriers to birth control for women. Currently, pharmacists in Oregon, California, Colorado, Hawaii, Maryland, and New Mexico have authority to prescribe birth control after receiving specialized training and certification from their respective state Board of Pharmacy. Other states are considering this legislation, including Illinois, Minnesota, Missouri, and New Hampshire.

Australia
The first oral contraceptive introduced outside the United States was Schering's Anovlar (norethisterone acetate 4 mg + ethinylestradiol 50 µg) on January 1, 1961, in Australia.

Germany
The first oral contraceptive introduced in Europe was Schering's Anovlar on June 1, 1961, in West Germany. The lower hormonal dose, still in use, was studied by the Belgian Gynaecologist Ferdinand Peeters.

United Kingdom
Before the mid-1960s, the United Kingdom did not require pre-marketing approval of drugs. The British Family Planning Association (FPA) through its clinics was then the primary provider of family planning services in the UK and provided only contraceptives that were on its Approved List of Contraceptives (established in 1934). In 1957, Searle began marketing Enavid (Enovid 10 mg in the U.S.) for menstrual disorders. Also in 1957, the FPA established a Council for the Investigation of Fertility Control (CIFC) to test and monitor oral contraceptives which began animal testing of oral contraceptives and in 1960 and 1961 began three large clinical trials in Birmingham, Slough, and London.

In March 1960, the Birmingham FPA began trials of noretynodrel 2.5 mg + mestranol 50 µg, but a high pregnancy rate initially occurred when the pills accidentally contained only 36 µg of mestranol—the trials were continued with noretynodrel 5 mg + mestranol 75 µg (Conovid in the UK, Enovid 5 mg in the U.S.).
In August 1960, the Slough FPA began trials of noretynodrel 2.5 mg + mestranol 100 µg (Conovid-E in the UK, Enovid-E in the U.S.).
In May 1961, the London FPA began trials of Schering's Anovlar.

In October 1961, at the recommendation of the Medical Advisory Council of its CIFC, the FPA added Searle's Conovid to its Approved List of Contraceptives.
On December 4, 1961, Enoch Powell, then Minister of Health, announced that the oral contraceptive pill Conovid could be prescribed through the NHS at a subsidized price of 2s per month.
In 1962, Schering's Anovlar and Searle's Conovid-E were added to the FPA's Approved List of Contraceptives.

France
On December 28, 1967, the Neuwirth Law legalized contraception in France, including the pill. The pill is the most popular form of contraception in France, especially among young women. It accounts for 60% of the birth control used in France. The abortion rate has remained stable since the introduction of the pill.

Japan
In Japan, lobbying from the Japan Medical Association prevented the pill from being approved for general use for nearly 40 years. The higher dose "second generation" pill was approved for use in cases of gynecological problems, but not for birth control. Two main objections raised by the association were safety concerns over long-term use of the pill, and concerns that pill use would lead to decreased use of condoms and thereby potentially increase sexually transmitted infection (STI) rates.

However, when the Ministry of Health and Welfare approved Viagra's use in Japan after only six months of the application's submission, while still claiming that the pill required more data before approval, women's groups cried foul. The pill was subsequently approved for use in June 1999, when Japan became the last UN member country to do so. However, the pill has not become popular in Japan. According to estimates, only 1.3 percent of 28 million Japanese females of childbearing age use the pill, compared with 15.6 percent in the United States. The pill prescription guidelines the government has endorsed require pill users to visit a doctor every three months for pelvic examinations and undergo tests for sexually transmitted diseases and uterine cancer. In the United States and Europe, in contrast, an annual or bi-annual clinic visit is standard for pill users. However, beginning as far back as 2007, many Japanese OBGYNs have required only a yearly visit for pill users, with multiple checks a year recommended only for those who are older or at increased risk of side effects. As of 2004, condoms accounted for 80% of birth control use in Japan, and this may explain Japan's comparatively low rates of AIDS.

Society and culture
The pill was approved by the FDA in the early 1960s; its use spread rapidly in the late part of that decade, generating an enormous social impact. Time magazine placed the pill on its cover in April, 1967. In the first place, it was more effective than most previous reversible methods of birth control, giving women unprecedented control over their fertility. Its use was separate from intercourse, requiring no special preparations at the time of sexual activity that might interfere with spontaneity or sensation, and the choice to take the pill was a private one. This combination of factors served to make the pill immensely popular within a few years of its introduction.

Claudia Goldin, among others, argue that this new contraceptive technology was a key player in forming women's modern economic role, in that it prolonged the age at which women first married allowing them to invest in education and other forms of human capital as well as generally become more career-oriented. Soon after the birth control pill was legalized, there was a sharp increase in college attendance and graduation rates for women. From an economic point of view, the birth control pill reduced the cost of staying in school. The ability to control fertility without sacrificing sexual relationships allowed women to make long term educational and career plans.

Because the pill was so effective, and soon so widespread, it also heightened the debate about the moral and health consequences of pre-marital sex and promiscuity. Never before had sexual activity been so divorced from reproduction. For a couple using the pill, intercourse became purely an expression of love, or a means of physical pleasure, or both; but it was no longer a means of reproduction. While this was true of previous contraceptives, their relatively high failure rates and their less widespread use failed to emphasize this distinction as clearly as did the pill. The spread of oral contraceptive use thus led many religious figures and institutions to debate the proper role of sexuality and its relationship to procreation. The Roman Catholic Church in particular, after studying the phenomenon of oral contraceptives, re-emphasized the stated teaching on birth control in the 1968 papal encyclical Humanae vitae. The encyclical reiterated the established Catholic teaching that artificial contraception distorts the nature and purpose of sex. On the other side Anglican and other Protestant churches, such as the Evangelical Church in Germany (EKD), accepted the combined oral contraceptive pill.

The United States Senate began hearings on the pill in 1970 and where different viewpoints were heard from medical professionals. Dr. Michael Newton, President of the College of Obstetricians and Gynecologists said:

Another physician, Dr. Roy Hertz of the Population Council, said that anyone who takes this should know of "our knowledge and ignorance in these matters" and that all women should be made aware of this so they can decide to take the pill or not.

The Secretary of Health, Education, and Welfare at the time, Robert Finch, announced the federal government had accepted a compromise warning statement which would accompany all sales of birth control pills.

Result on popular culture
The introduction of the birth control pill in 1960 allowed more women to find employment opportunities and further their education. As a result of women getting more jobs and an education, their husbands had to start taking over household tasks like cooking. Wanting to stop the change that was occurring in terms of gender norms in an American household, many films, television shows, and other popular culture items portrayed what an ideal American family should be. Below are listed some examples:

Poem
 The Pill Versus the Springhill Mine Disaster was the title poem of a 1968 collection by Richard Brautigan.

Music
 Singer Loretta Lynn commented on how women no longer had to choose between a relationship and a career in her 1974 album with a song entitled "The Pill", which told the story of a married woman's use of the drug to liberate herself from her traditional role as wife and mother.

Environmental impact
A woman using COCPs excretes from her urine and feces natural estrogens, estrone (E1) and estradiol (E2), and synthetic estrogen ethinylestradiol (EE2).
These hormones can pass through water treatment plants and into rivers. Other forms of contraception, such as the contraceptive patch, use the same synthetic estrogen (EE2) that is found in COCPs, and can add to the hormonal concentration in the water when flushed down the toilet. This excretion is shown to play a role in causing endocrine disruption, which affects the sexual development and reproduction of wild fish populations in segments of streams contaminated by treated sewage effluents.
A study done in British rivers supported the hypothesis that the incidence and the severity of intersex wild fish populations were significantly correlated with the concentrations of the E1, E2, and EE2 in the rivers.

A review of activated sludge plant performance found estrogen removal rates varied considerably but averaged 78% for estrone, 91% for estradiol, and 76% for ethinylestradiol (estriol effluent concentrations are between those of estrone and estradiol, but estriol is a much less potent endocrine disruptor to fish).

Several studies have suggested that reducing human population growth through increased access to contraception, including birth control pills, can be an effective strategy for climate change mitigation as well as adaptation. According to Thomas Wire, contraception is the 'greenest technology' because of its cost-effectiveness in combating global warming — each $7 spent on contraceptives would reduce global carbon emissions by 1 tonne over four decades, while achieving the same result with low-carbon technologies would require $32.

See also 
 Estradiol-containing oral contraceptive
 Hormone replacement therapy (HRT)
 List of estrogens available in the United States
 List of progestogens available in the United States
 Progestogen-only injectable contraceptive

References

Further reading

External links 
 The Birth Control Pill—CBC Digital Archives
 The Birth of the Pill—slide show by Life magazine

Combined oral contraceptives
Hepatotoxins
Sexual revolution
World Health Organization essential medicines